Sladen Summit is a prominent peak rising to 3,395 m at the intersection of the Johns Hopkins Ridge and Rampart Ridge, in the Royal Society Range, Victoria Land. Named by Advisory Committee on Antarctic Names (US-ACAN) in 1994 after William J.L. Sladen, an American of British birth; Falkland Islands Dependencies Survey (FIDS) medical officer at Hope Bay (1948–49) and Signy Island (1950–51); United States Antarctic Research Program (USARP) principal investigator (penguins) at Cape Crozier for many years.

Mountains of Victoria Land
Scott Coast